In computing, partial evaluation is a technique for several different types of program optimization by specialization. The most straightforward application is to produce new programs that run faster than the originals while being guaranteed to behave in the same way.

A computer program prog is seen as a mapping of input data into output data:

 

where , the static data, is the part of the input data known at compile time.

The partial evaluator transforms  into  by precomputing all static input at compile time.  is called the "residual program" and should run more efficiently than the original program.

Futamura projections
A particularly interesting example of the use of partial evaluation, first described in the 1970s by Yoshihiko Futamura, is when prog is an interpreter for a programming language.

If Istatic is source code designed to run inside that interpreter, then partial evaluation of the interpreter with respect to this data/program produces prog*, a version of the interpreter that only runs that source code, is written in the implementation language of the interpreter, does not require the source code to be resupplied, and runs faster than the original combination of the interpreter and the source. In this case prog* is effectively a compiled version of Istatic.

This technique is known as the first Futamura projection, of which there are three:
 Specializing an interpreter for given source code, yielding an executable.
 Specializing the specializer for the interpreter (as applied in #1), yielding a compiler.
 Specializing the specializer for itself (as applied in #2), yielding a tool that can convert any interpreter to an equivalent compiler.

They were described by Futamura in Japanese in 1971 and in English in 1983.

See also
 Compile-time function execution
 Memoization
 Partial application
 Run-time algorithm specialisation
 smn theorem
 Strength reduction
 Template metaprogramming

References

General references

External links

 Applying Dynamic Partial Evaluation to dynamic, reflective programming languages

Compiler optimizations
Evaluation strategy